Mayra del Rocío Rocha (born 26 October 1988 in Aguascalientes) is a road cyclist from Mexico. She participated at the 2012 UCI Road World Championships.

Major results
2013
2nd Team Pursuit, Copa Internacional de Pista (with Íngrid Drexel, Ana María Hernandez and Erika Haydee Varela Huerta)
2014
2nd  Team Pursuit, Central American and Caribbean Games (with Jessica Bonilla, Íngrid Drexel and Yareli Salazar)
2nd Points Race, Copa Internacional de Pista
2015
3rd  Team Pursuit, Pan American Games (with Sofía Arreola, Íngrid Drexel and Yareli Salazar)
2016
2nd  Team Pursuit, Pan American Track Championships (with Jessica Bonilla, Sofía Arreola and Yareli Salazar)

References

External links

 profile at Procyclingstats.com

1988 births
Mexican female cyclists
Living people
Sportspeople from Aguascalientes
Cyclists at the 2011 Pan American Games
Cyclists at the 2015 Pan American Games
Pan American Games medalists in cycling
Pan American Games bronze medalists for Mexico
Medalists at the 2015 Pan American Games
20th-century Mexican women
21st-century Mexican women
Competitors at the 2014 Central American and Caribbean Games
Competitors at the 2018 Central American and Caribbean Games